Repo Man is the soundtrack album to the eponymous 1984 film, Repo Man. The soundtrack features songs by various punk rock bands such as the Plugz, Black Flag, the Circle Jerks, Suicidal Tendencies, Iggy Pop and others. The film score was created by Tito Larriva, Steven Hufsteter, Charlie Quintana and Tony Marsico of the Plugz. Iggy Pop volunteered to write the title song after his manager viewed a screening of the film.

Background
A website Creative Noise noted the soundtrack as a snapshot of the early-1980s Los Angeles hardcore punk scene of the time. Director Cox wanted the music to serve as a backdrop to the story of the life of the repo men.

Track listing

Reception
Noel Murray of The Dissolve website in 2013 considered Black Flag's "TV Party", Suicidal Tendencies's "Institutionalized", Circle Jerks' "Coup d'État", and Fear's "Let's Have a War" the highlights of the soundtrack. Stephen Cook of AllMusic rated the soundtrack four and a half stars out of five.

See also
The Decline of Western Civilization
American Laundromat Records released a tribute album featuring all covers of the iconic punk rock soundtrack, track by track. https://en.m.wikipedia.org/wiki/American_Laundromat_Records

References

1984 soundtrack albums
Music of Los Angeles